39th Avenue may refer to:

39 Avenue station (Calgary), a light rail station in Calgary, Alberta, Canada
39th Avenue station (BMT Astoria Line), a New York City Subway station